Racism in Spain can be traced back to any historical era, during which social, economic and political conflicts have efficiently been justified by racial differences, be it in the form of racism as an ideology or in the form of racism as simple attitudes or behaviors towards those who are perceived as being different. More common than racism per se are the attitudes linked to xenophobia and nationalism (specially the Spanish, the Catalan and the Basque ones), as well as religious and/or linguistic-cultural hatred.

Historical roots
During the Spanish inquisition, the descendants of Jews and Muslims were targeted the most. This policy was called Limpieza de sangre (Blood Cleansing). Even after a Jew or a Muslim (Muwallad, an Arab or a Berber) converted to Christianity, the contemporary Spanish authorities referred to them and their descendants as New Christians, and as a result, they were the targets of popular and institutional discrimination and  they were also the targets of suspicion by the Spanish Inquisition. New Christians of Muslim heritage were referred to as moriscos, meaning Moor-like. Those of Jewish heritage were termed Conversos and those who secretly continued to practice Judaism were referred to as marranos (either from the Spanish word marrar which means to err/deviate or from the Spanish word marrano which means "swine".). After the Reconquista, many Mudéjars (individual Moors, who remained in Iberia after the Christian Reconquista but were not converted to Christianity) remained in Spain as practicing Muslims and Sephardic Jews were required to convert to Catholicism or leave the country in 1492. Attitudes towards Moriscos varied in different regions, but they were never the main targets of the Inquisition. A few decades after the War of the Alpujarras, during which the Muslim-majority population of Granada rebelled, the King of Spain ordered the Expulsion of the Moriscos from Spain, which was successfully implemented in the eastern region of Valencia and was less successfully  implemented in the rest of Spain.
While Medieval persecutions of Jews and Muslims were aimed at converting or eliminating non-Christians, limpieza de sangre was linked to the ancestry of the new Christians, regardless of their fervor or their lack of it.

Enslavement of Sub-Saharan Africans
During the Late Middle Ages and during the Modern era, a small number of Sub-Saharan Africans were captured or bought and sold as slaves.
The slaves who were born in Sub-Saharan Africa were called bozales.
Their descendants were called Black Ladinos because they had a better command of the Spanish language.
During the Spanish colonization of the Americas, the territories which were inhabited by Native Americans were massively depopulated as a result of mass genocide, Old World illnesses and the hardships which were caused by the conquest and the exploitation which followed it.
Sub-Saharan African slaves were taken to the Indies as laborers. Initially, they were taken from Spain and later, they were taken from Sub-Saharan Africa. Today, the descendants of these enslaved black people still populate the former Spanish colonies and as a result, they constitute a major community within the African diaspora.

Gitanos

The Gitanos are the descendants of Romani people who migrated from Northern Africa and France and arrived in Spain in the late Middle Ages.
They lived a nomadic lifestyle until the 20th century and as a result, they were blamed for crime by the sedentary population.
The authorities' treatment of the Gitanos varied from persecution to forcible assimilation.

The Gitanos are the descendants of Romani people who migrated from the Indian Subcontinent and began migrating towards Europe during the 10th and 11th centuries. The earliest documentation of Romani people’s presence in Spain is traced back to the 15th century. 

The Roma population is the longest-standing ethnic minority in Spain and has a long history of being discriminated against and ostracized in both Spanish and European history. Discrimination based on ethnocultural differences and physical characteristics (such as skin color) has contributed to the exclusion of Roma populations and the historical persecution of the Roma in Spain. The Roma population is the most overlooked minority group in the formation of diversity policy in Spain. Demographic surveys taken from the years 2000 to 2007 found that 8% of the Spanish population was made up of Romani people. Many have assimilated into Spanish society, while others have continued to lead their traditional lives in small, isolated communities. 

Discrimination against the Roma community in Spain has not ended, and the United Nations special rapporteur on extreme poverty and human rights has spoken out about the mistreatment of the Roma/Gypsy community in Spain. In 2020 the UN reported that half of the 750,000 Roma living in Spain live below the poverty line and face contemporary forms of discrimination, such as job and housing discrimination. Socially, the Roma populations are less educated than the native Spanish population, and 70% of Roma adults in Spain are illiterate (European Roma and Travellers Forum).

Spread of scientific racism
According to Gonzalo Álvarez Chillida, scientific racism, which was prevalent in Europe during the 19th and 20th centuries, can be considered a doctrine which "affirmed the inherited biological determinism of the moral and intellectual capacities of an individual, and the division of groups of humans into races differentiated by physical traits associated to immutable, inherited moral and intellectual traits" and "affirms the superiority of certain races over others, protected by racial purity and ruined through racial mixing", which "leads to the national right of superior races to impose themselves over the inferior". According to Chillida, such an ideology had difficulties in penetrating Spain due to the concept of "casticismo" which was inverted or ingrained in Spanish society, according to this concept, Spanish castes were considered religious lineages rather than races, in contraposition to the "Moor" and the "Jew". In the Spanish psyche, the Christian-Jewish dichotomy remained predominant over the more modern and racialized aryan-Semite dichotomy, which was developed in Northern Europe.

Eugenic ideas were slow to enter the country; the First Spanish Eugenics Conferences were held in 1928, and the second Spanish Eugenics conferences were held in 1933. Recasens Siches defended racist stances in those conferences. Jurist Quintiliano Saldaña advocated the imposition of a national policy of sterilizations but he received a paltry amount of support in the country.

Xenophobia among ethnic Spaniards

Along with the traditional racism against Jews, Muslims and Romani, Spaniards are known to have extremely xenophobic attitudes among themselves, depending on their region of origin and/or their mother tongue. Over the last 200 years, many Spaniards have nurtured a ferocious hatred for each other, depending on their mother tongue/nationalist identity (Catalan/Valencian, Galician and Basque speakers versus Spanish speakers; Catalan, Valencian, Galician and Basque nationalists versus Spanish nationalists). Nationalist antagonisms among Spaniards reached a climax during the Spanish Civil War and they paralleled the right-wing versus left-wing antagonism. The mass emigration of the Spanish-speaking population from the poorer regions of Spain to Catalonia and the Basque country exacerbated those antagonisms, because many Catalans, Valencians and Basques despised the newcomers because they were poor, a feeling which was exhacerbated by their fear that the Spanish central authorities were attempting to dilute ethnic Catalans, Valencians, Basques and northern Navarrese into the ethnic Spanish majority by using the newcomers as their tools. Nowadays, Spanish media outlets, particularly Spanish right-wing media outlets which are based in Madrid (specially journals like ABC, La Razón, El Mundo, El Español, OKdiario, Periodista Digital, Vozpópuli, Libertad Digital or even El País; as well as radio stations like esRadio or Onda Cero; and television channels like Intereconomía or Telemadrid), and Catalan (specially the main regional public television channel TV3, radio stations like Catalunya Radio, and journals like Avui or El Nacional.cat) and Basque nationalist (particularly the main regional public television channel Euskal Irrati Telebista) media outlets which are based in their respective regions, regularly tend to foment confrontations between Spaniards who are from different regions of Spain; these confrontations ultimately coincide with the conflicts of interest which exist between the Spanish central oligarchies which are based in Madrid, and the peripheral Catalan and Basque oligarchies which are based in Barcelona and Bilbao respectively. Most notably and particularly over the last decade, these conflicts have been exhacerbated on account of the Catalan independence movement.

See also
 Antisemitism in Spain
 Basque conflict
 Catalan independence movement
 Environmental racism in Spain
 History of the Jews in Spain
 History of Spain
 Human rights in Spain
 Islam in Spain
 Sabino Arana
 Spanish nationalism
 Valentí Almirall i Llozer

References